Luxembourg competed at the 1980 Summer Paralympics in Arnhem, Netherlands. 9 competitors from Luxembourg won a single bronze medal and finished joint 38th in the medal table with Greece and Malta.

See also 
 Luxembourg at the Paralympics
 Luxembourg at the 1980 Summer Olympics

References 

Luxembourg at the Paralympics
1980 in Luxembourgian sport
Nations at the 1980 Summer Paralympics